Faalelei Sione (born 19 February 1996) is an Australian rugby union player who plays for  in the Mitre 10 Cup. His position of choice is prop.

References 

Australian rugby union players
ACT Brumbies players
Rugby union props
1996 births
Living people
Canberra Vikings players
Manawatu rugby union players
Rugby union players from Canberra